The Russian Foreign Services  is a complex of measures, carried out by specialized companies to help integrate Russians into their new society,  to give wide-ranging support to the Russian citizens while they are abroad. Assistance is provided to ensure comfortable stay of Russian-speaking citizens abroad, through offering the information support during transportation, transfer, accommodation in hotels, organization of excursions, providing concierge services and resolving domestic problems.

History of the question

Every year the passenger traffic of Russian citizens increases for various reasons. During 2013, with different goals around 42.6 million Russians left the country. This value is 14% higher than in 2012. Trips abroad have a tourist character, and also are linked to employment, education and business trips, visits of relatives.
In case of organized tours responsibility for the safe and comfortable stay of people abroad lies on tour operator, but in the case of individual business or friendly trips a person remains with problems alone. 
Insufficient knowledge of foreign languages makes uncomfortable staying of Russians abroad. According to official documents slightly more than half of the population of Russia knows foreign languages,  33% of this number on initial level of language proficiency and only 5% speak fluently.
To solve the problems related to  stay Russians abroad  the group of specialized government and private services created.

Embassies of Russian Federation
Embassies of Russian Federations are parts of Russian Foreign Diplomatic Missions subordinate to the Russian Ministry of Foreign Affairs. Embassy of the Russian Federation (hereinafter referred to the Embassy) is a public government service, which organizes the representation of Russian Federation in foreign countries. According to the main document  embassies serve as representation of the Russian Federation in the state of residence;
ensuring the national interests, the implementation of foreign policy of the Russian Federation in the state of residence;
execution of orders of the President of the Russian Federation, the Government of the Russian Federation, Ministry of foreign Affairs of Russia, as well as agreed with the foreign Ministry of Russia and other Federal structures, enterprises, institutions and organizations.

Foreign trade and economic missions
Foreign trade and economic missions subordinate the Russian Chamber of Commerce and defined as set of measures aimed to establishment and development relations with foreign countries to improve  economic potential of Russia and its regions. The goal of the mission is assistance to Russian entrepreneurs, producers and exporters in the promotion of industrial products, goods and services for foreign markets, providing cooperation between the countries in trade, investment, as well as all types of cooperatives. The mission assists in the organization of congresses and exhibitions and fairs.
Missions can be representatives of regional Russian Chamber of Commerce and their enterprises and organizations, unions and associations of Industrialists and entrepreneurs.

Russian Foreign Cultural Centers
Russian foreign cultural centers subordinate to the Russian Ministry of Foreign Affairs and exist according to the Article 18 of the Fundamentals of Russian Legislation. 
According to this law named "Rights to cultural activities in foreign countries" citizens of Russian Federation shall have the right to carry out cultural activities in foreign countries, to create a cultural institution in the territory of other states, if the latter does not contradict the laws of those countries. Russian Cultural Centers are resource centers that provide access to a broad range of learning materials and popular science information from Russia. Most important function of centers as an educational system facilitating the study of Russian language and culture based on progressive methodology and programs.
Russian Centers look like platforms providing the opportunity to organize artistic performances, academic discussions and informal gatherings of representatives of various cultural groups. Traditionally Russian Cultural Centers are equipped with print, audio and video materials from Russia organized into the following categories:  Culture and Art; Science; Education; Russian Language; History; Society; and Contemporary Russia

Consular centers
Consular center provides civil attitude of the Russian Federation and foreign countries, protection of rights and legitimate interests of the Russian Federation, its citizens and legal entities abroad. These centers are coordinated by the Consular Department of the Structural Unit of the Central apparatus of the Ministry of Foreign Affairs of the Russian Federation.
Today consular activity is providing in 239 consular institutions. In the early 90s Russia created the institution of honorary consuls, which is also an effective mechanism of protection of Russian citizens. In current time there are about 105 of the honorary consuls of the Russian Federation.
.
Consular officers carry out notarial actions, registration of Vital records acts, protect the rights of Russian citizens abroad, shall take appropriate actions to guarantee safety of citizens in emergency situations, can organize centralized evacuation of people from the country.

Private Foreign Services
The help provided by Russian diplomatic missions  abroad is minimal and it is given only after the registration in the Consulate and the submission of the list of the documents. It comes down to the issue of different documents and to the fulfillment of notarial operations. Russian citizens can also get support in returning to the motherland, but only in the exceptional situation when they  are deficient of the means for living 
. So in the majority of cases people have to solve themselves their troubles when some complicated domestic  situations and problems arise (the use of the public transport, currency exchange, the purchase of medicine,  ignorance of local laws and traditions, the loss of the luggage, etc.).  Even small domestic problems that can be easily solved in the native country can become extreme for compatriots living in a foreign country and can result not only in financial and time losses, but moral harm as well.
Till 2014 there was no unified information service that was aimed to provide regular 24-hour support to Russian citizens in any place of the globe. Only few companies and societies that exist in the Russian tourist market solve this matter. Among such companies are information "Service of continents", "Wellcare" service, IP-Travel. Such companies operate in the field of tourism collaborating with tourist agencies and tour operators. Problems that can occur during the trip abroad vary a lot and depend on the activity of multiple participants who create a tour product. Any step of the trip is influenced by different factors and companies have to deal not only with matters connected with transportation and accommodation of a tourist in a country abroad and organization of excursions. It’s inevitable that difficulties in communication with officials and commercial bodies or local citizens arise, and it’s connected with the ignorance of laws and traditions of the other country and a language barrier. The cases of injuries, illness and accidents are not rare and it’s not possible to predict them and it’s rather difficult for a person to cope with such a case all alone. The support of the service companies becomes invaluable. But it must be noted that the range of citizens going abroad is not limited to only tourists. Russians go abroad for various reasons, and regardless of the aim of the arrival abroad, a person will initially need help and support. That’s why special attention is paid to the service companies that provide comprehensive support of a Russian-speaking citizen in every step of  stay in a new country.

References

Society of Russia